Louis Jean Pierre Vieillot commences Histoire naturelle des oiseaux de l'Amérique septentrionale. Desray, Paris (1807-1808).
Alexander Wilson commences  the nine-volume American Ornithology (1808–1814), illustrating 268 species of birds, 26 of which had not previously been described.
John William Lewin's  Birds of New Holland with their Natural History published in London. He writes the first description of the Regent bowerbird in this work.
Coenraad Jacob Temminck publishes  Histoire naturelle générale des pigeons et des gallinacés. Sepps, Amsterdam 1808–15.

Birding and ornithology by year
Birding